Ziauddin Sardar (born 31 October 1951) is a British-Pakistani scholar, award-winning writer, cultural critic and public intellectual who specialises in Muslim thought, the future of Islam, futurology and science and cultural relations. The author and editor of more than 50 books, Prospect magazine has named him as one of Britain's top 100 public intellectuals and The Independent newspaper calls him: 'Britain's own Muslim polymath'.

Brief biography
Ziauddin Sardar was born in Dipalpur, Punjab, Pakistan.  However, he was both educated and brought up in Britain. His family belonged to the Durrani warrior clan that founded the state that ultimately became Afghanistan after the break-up of Persia following the assassination of Nader Shah in 1747. Under the Raj, it was official policy to recruit the so-called "martial races" from what is now modern northern India, Pakistan and Nepal into the military. His grandfather served in the Indian Army under the Raj, was decorated for bravery during the Boxer Rebellion in China, and the family's surname was changed from Durrani to Sardar, Urdu for Leader, in recognition of his courage in leading men under fire. Sardar's grandfather also served under William Birdwood when he was a junior officer in the Indian Army, and when his son immigrated to Britain, he sought out the company of Birdwood's son, Christopher and his daughter-in-law, Lady Birdwood.

Ziauddin Sardar, when growing up in 1960s London, was lectured by Lady Birdwood on his English. In 1968, she tried to recruit him into her anti-immigration crusade, arguing that having a Muslim Pakistani immigrant writing for her magazine, New Times, would dispel the charges of racism being made against her. Sardar recalled speaking with fury as he rejected her offer, causing her to storm out of his family's house, never to return. Sardar was bullied as a teenager by "Paki-bashing" white youths, and he imagined Lady Birdwood as a churail, the seductive, but ferocious female demons of Urdu folklore. Sardar argued that Lady Birdwood with her thesis that to be British was to be white was not "aberration" in British life, but rather was she was the "quintessence" of Britishness. Referring to Lady Birdwood's convictions in the 1990s for writing, printing and handing out anti-Semitic literature, Sarder wrote: "Racism as overt as that preached by all her hate literature is merely the flip side of the Great Tradition, the underlying, but unstated message of the 'Great Books of Mankind' that I read in my childhood. It is the notion of civilization as a one-way street, an inexorable path of progress that must take all peoples towards the same pinnacle, by the same route".         

He read physics and then information science at the City University, London. After a five-year stint at King Abdul Aziz University, Jeddah, Saudi Arabia – where he became a leading authority on the hajj, the pilgrimage to Mecca —– he returned to work as Middle East correspondent of the science magazines Nature and New Scientist. In 1982, he joined London Weekend Television as a reporter and helped launch the trend-setting Asian programme Eastern Eye. In the early 1980s, he was among the founders of Inquiry, a magazine of ideas and policy focusing on Muslim countries, which played a major part in promoting reformist thought in Islam. While editing Inquiry, he established the Center for Policy and Futures Studies at East-West University in Chicago.

In 1987 Sardar moved to Kuala Lumpur as an advisor to Anwar Ibrahim, the Education Minister. Ibrahim went on to become Deputy Prime Minister of Malaysia and following his imprisonment on fabricated charges, the leader of the Opposition. He came back to London in the late 1990s to work as Visiting Professor of Science Studies at Middlesex University, and write for the New Statesman, where he later became a columnist. In 1999, he was appointed editor of Futures, the monthly journal of policy, planning and futurology, and became involved in Third Text, the prestigious journal of arts and visual culture, which he co-edited till 2005. Also in 1999, he moved to the City University London, London, as Visiting Professor of Postcolonial Studies. From 2001 to 2013, he was Professor of Law and Society in the School of Law at Middlesex University.

After leaving London Weekend Television, Sardar wrote and presented a number of programmes for the BBC and Channel 4. He conceived and presented Encounters With Islam for the BBC in 1983, and two years later his 13-half-hour interview series Faces of Islam was broadcast on TV3 (Malaysia) and other channels in Asia.  In 1990, he wrote and presented a programme on Islamic science for BBC's Antenna and his six-part Islamic Conversations was broadcast on Channel 4 early in 1995. He wrote and presented the highly acclaimed Battle for Islam, a 90-minute film for BBC2 in 2005. And followed that with Between the Mullahs and the Military, a 50-minute documentary on Pakistan for Channel 4's Dispatches series. Most recently he wrote the three-part one-hour documentary The Life of Muhammad for BBC2, broadcast in July 2011. He has appeared on numerous television programmes, including the Andrew Marr Show and Hard Talk, and was a regular member of the 'Friday Panel' on Sky News World News Tonight during 2006 and 2007. He appears in various filmed philosophical debates at the Institute of Art and Ideas.

Sardar was amongst the first Commissioners of the UK's Equality and Human Rights Commission (March 2005 – December 2009); and served as a Member of the Interim National Security Forum at the Cabinet Office, London, during 2009 and 2010. His journalism and reviews have appeared in The Guardian, The Independent, The Times, the UK weekly magazine, New Statesman and the monthly magazine New Internationalist. Sardar's online work includes a year-long project for the Guardian, 'Blogging the Qur'an', published in 2008.

In 2009, Sardar re-launched the defunct Muslim Institute as a learned society that supports and promotes the growth of thought, knowledge, research, creativity and open debate; and became the Chair of the reorganized Muslim Institute Trust. He conceived and launched, in 2011, the quarterly Critical Muslim, a ground-breaking journal of freethinking that seeks new readings of Islam and Muslim culture, jointly published by the Muslim Institute and Hurst & Co.

In 2014, Sardar re-launched the Center for Policy and Futures Studies at East-West University as The Center for Postnormal Policy and Futures Studies , which focuses more acutely on his recent work on Postnormal Times.

National Life Stories conducted an oral history interview (C1672/32) with Ziauddin Sardar in 2016 for its Science and Religion collection held by the British Library.

Life and thought
Sardar has lived the life of a scholar-adventurer and has travelled extensively throughout the world. From 1974 to 1979, he lived in Jeddah, Saudi Arabia, where he worked for the Hajj Research Centre at the King Abdul Aziz University. During this period he travelled throughout the Islamic world researching his first book, Science, Technology and Development in the Muslim World (Croom Helm, 1977). In the early 1980s, he edited the pioneering Muslim magazine 'Inquiry', before establishing the Centre for Policy and Futures Studies at East-West University in Chicago. During the 1990s, he lived in Kuala Lumpur. He has also lived in Chicago and The Hague and for short periods in Cairo and Fez.

Sardar describes himself as a 'critical polymath'. His thought is characterised by a strong accent on diversity, pluralism and dissenting perspectives. Science journalist Ehsan Masood suggests that Sardar 'deliberately cultivates a carefully calculated ambiguity projecting several things at once, yet none of them on their own'. Futurist Tony Stevenson points out that his 'intellectual aggression' hides a 'sincere and deep humanity': 'while his cultural analysis is surgically incisive, it is largely free of the theoretical correctness of academic thought', while he 'draws on a depth of academic thought', he 'always remains accessible'.

The fundamental principle of Sardar's thought is that 'there is more than one way to be human'. 'I do not regard "the human" either as "the" or as a priori given', he has said. 'The western way of being human is one amongst many. Similarly, the Islamic way of being human is also one amongst many. The Australian aboriginal way of being human is also another way of being human. I see each culture as a complete universe with its own way of knowing, being and doing – and hence, its own way of being human'. The corollary is that there are also different ways of knowing. The question that Sardar has always asked is: 'how do you know? The answer depends a great deal on who 'you' are: 'how you look at the world, how you shape your inquiry, the period and culture that shapes your outlook and the values that frame how you think'.

Considered a pioneering writer on Islam and contemporary cultural issues, he has produced some fifty books over a period of 30 years, some with his long-time co-author Merryl Wyn Davies. These books include the classic studies The Future of Muslim Civilisation (1979) and Islamic Futures: The Shape of Ideas to Come (1985), a vigorous intellectual assault on postmodern thought, Postmodernism and the Other (1998) and Orientalism (1999), and the international bestseller Why Do People Hate America? (2002). He has published two highly acclaimed books on cities: The Consumption of Kuala Lumpur (2000) and Mecca: The Sacred City, which won the first prize at the Lahore Literature Festival in 2014 and the Ramnath Goenka Award for Excellence in Journalism for a non-fiction book. Two collections of his essays and critical writings are available as readers: Islam, Postmodernism and Other Futures: A Ziauddin Sardar Reader (2003) and How Do You Know? Reading Ziauddin Sardar on Islam, Science and Cultural Relations (2006). His two volumes of autobiography, Desperately Seeking Paradise: Journeys of a Sceptical Muslim and Balti Britain: A Provocative Journey Through Asian Britain, have been highly praised. His latest book  Reading the Qur’an presents a humanist and pluralist reading of the sacred text of Islam.

Sardar's contribution to critical scholarship ranges far and wide, but is particularly relevant in six areas: Islam, Islamic Science, Futures, Postmodernism and Transmodernity, identity and multiculturalism and Postnormal Times.

Islam, Qur'an and Islamic reform
A believing Muslim, Sardar is one of the strongest internal critics of Islam. He believes that the tendency to fall back comfortably on age-old interpretations is now dangerously obsolete. Islam's relationship and attitude to women, minorities, and notions of exclusivity and exclusive truth need to change fundamentally. In his work, Reformist Ideas and Muslim Intellectuals, Sardar states that: "Muslims have been on the verge of physical, cultural and intellectual extinction simply because they have allowed parochialism and traditionalism to rule their minds." He adds: "We must break free from the ghetto mentality."

Sardar's most consistent output has been in the area of post-colonial Islamic reform, which is the subject of many of his books, including Islamic Futures: the Shape of Ideas to Come (Mansell, 1985) and The Future of Muslim Civilization (Mansell, 1987). Sardar believes that present-day Islamic societies have allowed creative thinking to fossilise. This is a situation which stands in contrast to Islamic history when scholars and scientists let their minds roam free and created an extraordinary renaissance in ideas, new knowledge and technology.

In Islamic futures, Sardar enunciates several principles that need to be at the heart of all contemporary Islamic societies. These include: the need to recognise and promote plurality and diversity; the need to achieve progress through a consensus; and to engage constructively with the modern world.

On the subject of Hadith and Qur'an, Sardar believes strongly that each generation must "reinterpret the textual sources in the light of its own experience", as happened throughout Islamic history and in each of the world's Islamic cultures. Sardar says that scripture needs to be seen as a product of its time and, therefore, must be periodically re-examined. If this process ceases to happen, sacred texts, according to Sardar, will lose their relevance to those who use and love them.

In his recent book, Reading the Qur’an, Sardar insists the interpretation of the Qur'an requires focus on four specific contexts. First, one needs to examine the context of the text itself and see what it is saying about the same subject in different places. Second, one needs to examine it in the context of the life of Prophet Muhammad and see what is happening to him, what is the event or the circumstances on which the Qur'an is commenting. Third, one must appreciate the verses of the Qur'an within the specific social, cultural, political and technological context of the Prophet's time – they often address the Prophet and his followers, and it speaks to them in the historical context in which they lived. The Qur'an is a text revealed in history. Fourth, we can only interpret the Qur'an according to our own contemporary understanding so we also bring our own social and cultural context into play. The contextual analysis of the Qur'an, Sardar suggests, shows that not everything in the Sacred Text is universal – many verses have significance for the time they were revealed. The universal message of the Qur'an can only be derived by examining its concepts and basic themes. The Qur'an, he argues, 'calls for rational, considered thought and interrogation not of appearances but of the deeper implications and meaning of how human beings think and act within and between all the diversity of our cultures, histories, languages and beliefs'.

Science and empires
As a child of parents who lived under the Raj as the colonial government was known in British India, much of Sardar's writings are about what happens to people, languages and institutions when one country is taken over by another country or empire. These ideas form the backbone to the second volume of his memors: Balti Britain (Granta, 2008). He has also written extensively on the relationship between knowledge and power, and on the development of scholarship that was designed to serve the needs of empire. Sardar argues that many advances in modern science and technology happened because of the needs of the military of European nation-states, or the many priorities of colonial authorities. In that sense he can be seen as a social-constructivist: someone who believes that the direction of science is dictated to a large extent by the social, political, cultural and financial priorities of societies and of those who fund science.

During the 1980s, while working for Nature and New Scientist, Sardar wrote and lectured on how an Islamic science for the modern world might look like. In his book Explorations in Islamic Science, he described 'Islamic science' as: "a subjectively objective enterprise". By this, he meant that it can be both rationalist and traditionalist at the same time. Islamic science for Sardar would be shaped around an Islamic world view. It will be a science in which humans will see themselves as trustees of the Earth (khilafa) and they will act with justice (adl). What is lawful and what is prohibited (halal and haram) will be based, both on a consensus of the community (ijma) and public benefit (istislah).

At the same time, Islamic science for Sardar is a universal science—grounded in empiricism and rationality. It is an experimental science that can be duplicated and repeated by all, regardless of faith and culture. Its nature and contents will reflect the foundations, as well as the needs, requirements and concerns of those living in Muslim cultures. Many Muslims see science as a way of discovering absolute truths, or finding proof of the existence of God. For Sardar, it is a way of highlighting the complex and interconnected nature of reality, and hence a form of worship. But it is also an organised way of solving problems and fulfilling the needs of individuals and society.

Futures
Sardar was the editor of the journal Futures from 1999 to 2012. His editorship is noted for turning Futures into a prime journal in the field of futurology; and opening the journal to other disciplines and to encourage them to explore futures alternatives.
His has explored what a viable future for Muslim civilisation will look like in his two studies, The Future of Muslim Civilisation and Islamic Futures: The Shape of Ideas to Come. In the former he argues that Muslim societies are obsessed with looking at their past and that the way forward is to reconstruct Muslim civilisation, intellectually and culturally, "brick by brick". Sardar suggests in this book what a Muslim future could look like. In the latter book, he offers a critique of ideas such as the notion of an "Islamic state" and "Islamic economics".

Later, he went on to develop a new discipline: that of ‘Islamic futures’. This was based on five principles: 1: Islam must engage with the contemporary world not just as a religion, but as a way of shaping and understanding the world. Islam can provide a matrix and methodology for tackling problems and generating future choices and possibilities for Muslim societies. 2: Muslims must perceive themselves as being a civilisation, rather than members of a set of fragmented nation states. This is the only way to avoid stagnation and marginalisation. 3: Plurality and diversity must become the cornerstones of Islam. 4: Shaping viable and desirable futures for a Muslim civilisation must involve the active participation of communities and conscious effort at consultation (shura) at all levels of society with the aim of achieving a broad consensus (ijma). 5: To shape desirable alternative futures, Muslims must engage constructively with the contemporary world in all its dimensions.

Sardar also argues that the future has already been colonised to a very large extent. Forecasting, prediction and other methods of studying are often used by larger nations in their attempts to control smaller ones. Sardar says: "To keep the future open to all potentials, alternatives and dissenting possibilities, Sardar believes that it is necessary to envisage alternative futures from different civilisational and cultural perspectives." He has argued further that futurology itself is not a discipline with rigid boundaries, fixed theories, esoteric terminology and ‘great men’ but an inter- and trans-disciplinary discourse that must emphasise open and pluralistic alternative futures. In a well cited paper, he presented Sardar's Four Laws of Futurology: Futurology are wicked (that is, they deal with complex, interconnected problems steeped in uncertainty and ignorance in a playway way); Futurology emphasise Mutually Assured Diversity (MAD), to ensure that diversity not only survives but thrives in any desirable future; Futurology are sceptical (of all popular futuristic projections and currents which are essentially attempts to colonize the future); and futurology are futureless – ‘since we can have no true knowledge of the future, the impact of all futures explorations can only be meaningfully assessed in the present’ and the true relevance of all futures exploration lies in the present.

Identity and multiculturalism
Sardar has written extensively on identity. He shares with the psychologist and philosopher from India, Ashis Nandy, the idea that humans do not have one but multiple identities. Identity, he argues, is not monolithic and static; but multiple and ever-changing.

He has said: "Many categories of identity that we have conventionally projected on others – such as the ‘evil Orientals’, the ‘inferior races of the colonies’, the immigrants, the Blacks, the refugees, the gypsies, the homosexuals – are now an integral part of ourselves. It is not just that they are our neighbours but their ideas, concepts, lifestyles, food, clothes now play a central part in shaping ‘us’ and ‘our society’. We thus have no yardstick to measure our difference and define ourselves."

In his book Orientalism and in Why Do People Hate America and American Dream, Global Nightmare, co-written with Merryl Wyn Davies, he explores how Muslims are perceived in books, films, television series and advertisements. He argues that the image of Muslims as "the darker side of Europe" seems to be a fixture of western consciousness and is recycled from generation to generation. In Aliens R Us, he says that Orientalist imagery has become an integral part of science fiction cinema.

Sardar is a strong supporter of multiculturalism. He argues that multiculturalism is concerned about transforming power to non-western cultures and allowing these cultures to speak for themselves.

In the first volume of his memoirs, Desperately Seeking Paradise, he explores different facets of Muslim identity. In Balti Britain, he explores what it means to be British and Asian in contemporary Britain. He has said: 'In Britain, we neglected to learn how we have been shaped by a long history of mutual entanglement and belonging. Without such learning we cannot give young British Asians the respect they deserve or appreciate the comfort so many have in living their compound identity, in being simultaneously British and Asian.

Postmodernism and transmodernity
Sardar is regarded by some as a 'postmodern' thinker. But he is at the same time a strong critic of what is called postmodernism. In his book Postmodernism and the Other, he describes postmodernism as "the new imperialism of Western culture". He argues that postmodernism is a continuation of colonialism and modernity and, as such, it further marginalises non-western cultures and tramples on their hopes and aspirations.

He says: "By pretending to give voice to the marginalised, postmodernism in fact undermines the histories, tradition, morality, religions and worldviews – everything that provides meaning and sense of direction to non-western cultures and societies. As such, postmodernism is a linear projection, a natural conclusion to modernity; and by privileging secularism it has become an arch ideology."

Sardar's alternative to postmodernism is what he calls "transmodernity". He describes this as: "the transfer of modernity and postmodernism from the edge of chaos to a new order of society". Transmodernity for Sardar is about finding a synthesis between "life enhancing tradition" – tradition that is amenable to change and transition – and a new form of modernity that respects the values and lifestyles of traditional cultures.

Postnormal Times 
Contemporary times, Sardar has argued recently, have become ‘postnormal’ and that we live in "Postnormal Times" 'The espiritu del tiempo, the spirit of our age, is characterised by uncertainty, rapid change, realignment of power, upheaval and chaotic behaviour. We live in an in-between period where old orthodoxies are dying, new ones have yet to be born, and very few things seem to make sense. Ours is a transitional age, a time without the confidence that we can return to any past we have known and with no confidence in any path to a desirable, attainable or sustainable future. It is a time when all choices seem perilous, likely to lead to ruin, if not entirely over the edge of the abyss. In our time it is possible to dream all dreams of visionary futures but almost impossible to believe we have the capability or commitment to make any of them a reality. We live in a state of flux beset by indecision: what is for the best, which is worse? We are disempowered by the risks, cowed into timidity by fear of the choices we might be inclined or persuaded to contemplate’. He identifies three drivers of postnormal times: complexity, chaos and contradictions. The three ‘c’s’, he argues, force us to rethink our ideas on progress, modernisation, efficiency and enhance the importance of social virtues, individual responsibility and ethics, and the role of imagination.

Postnormal times force us to focus on uncertainties, and the ignorances associated with them, that we will constantly encounter in the near and far future. Postnormal Times cannot be ‘managed’ or ‘controlled’; the best we can hope for is to navigate our way through uncertainties and ignorances to avoid the edge of chaos. Sardar and his colleagues have suggested that the best way to navigate postnormal times is to see the future as three tomorrows: 
  
 the ‘Extended Present’, with many empirically observed trends that are deeply embedded in the now and will manifest themselves in the coming years;  
 the Familiar Futures, which are mediated by images and imaginings of the future(s), from data-driven projections to science fiction; and  
 the Unthought Futures, which are not unthinkable but rather a horizon where something always remains unthought, which is to say that it is populated with seemingly infinite alternative futures.

The three tomorrows impact the present both individually and simultaneously.

Books
A Person of Pakistani Origins, Hurst, London, 2018
Editor, The Postnormal Times Reader, CPPFS/IIIT, London, 2017
(with Jeremy Henzell-Thomas), Rethinking Reform in Higher Education, IIIT, London, 2017
Islam Beyond the Violent Jihadis, Biteback, London, 2016
Mecca: The Sacred City, Bloomsbury, London, 2014
Future: All That Matters, Hodder Education, London, 2013
Muhammad: All That Matters, Hodder Education, London, 2012
Muslims In Britain: Making Social and Political Space, Routledge, London, 2012 (edited with Waqar Ahmad)
Reading the Qur’an, Hurst & Co, London; Oxford University Press, New York, 2011
Breaking the Monolith: Essays, Articles and Columns on Islam, India, Terror and Other Things That Annoy Me, ImprintOne, Delhi, 2008
Balti Britain: A Journey Through the British Asian Experience, Granta, London, 2008
How Do You Know? Reading Ziauddin Sardar on Islam, Science and Cultural Relations , Pluto Press 2006 (Introduced and edited by Ehsan Masood). .
What Do Muslims Believe? Granta, London, 2006.
Desperately Seeking Paradise: Journeys of a Sceptical Muslim, Granta, London, 2005
Islam, Postmodernism and Other Futures: a Ziauddin Sardar reader, Pluto Press, London 2004 (introduced and edited by Sohail Inayatullah and Gail Boxwell).
The A to Z of Postmodern Life: Essays on Global Culture in the Noughties, Vision, 2002
Aliens R Us: The Other in Science Fiction Cinema, Pluto Press, London, 2002 (Edited with Sean Cubitt)
The Third Text Reader on Art, Culture & Theory, Continuum, London, 2002 (Edited with Rasheed Araeen and Sean Cubitt)
The Consumption of Kuala Lumpur, Reaktion Books, London, 2000.
Thomas Kuhn and the Science Wars, Icon Books, Cambridge, 2000
Orientalism (Concepts in the Social Sciences Series), Open University Press, 1999
Rescuing All Our Futures: The Future of Future Studies, Adamantine Press, London
Postmodernism and the Other: New Imperialism of Western Culture, Pluto Press, London, 1997
Explorations in Islamic Science, Mansell, London, 1989; Centre for the Studies on Science, Aligarh, 1996
Muslim Minorities in The West, Grey Seal, London, 1995 (edited with S. Z. Abedin)
How We Know: Ilm and the Revival of Knowledge, Grey Seal, London, 1991
An Early Crescent: The Future of Knowledge and Environment in Islam, Mansell, London, 1989
The Revenge of Athena: Science, Exploitation and the Third World, Mansell, London, 1988
Science and Technology in the Middle East: A Guide to Issues, Organisations and Institutions, Longman, Harlow, 1982
The Touch of Midas: Science, Values and the Environment in Islam and the West, Manchester University Press, Manchester, 1982
Information and the Muslim World: A Strategy for the Twenty-first Century, Islamic Futures and Policy Studies, Mansell Publishing Limited, London and New York 1988
Shaping Information Systems of the Islamic World, Mansell, London, in 1988
Islamic Futures: The Shape of Ideas to Come, Mansell, London, 1986
The Future of Muslim Civilisation, Mansell, London, 1979
Hajj Studies, Crown Helm, London, 1979
Islam: Outline of a classification scheme, Clive Bingley, London, 1979
Muhammad: Aspects of a Biography, Islamic Foundation, Leicester, 1978
Science, Technology and Development in the Muslim World, Croom Helm, London; Humanities Press, New Jersey; 1977
Sardar has also contributed a number of books to the Introducing... series published by Icon Books, including Introducing Islam, Introducing Chaos, Introducing Cultural Studies, Introducing Media Studies, Introducing Mathematics and Introducing Postmodernism.

With Merryl Wyn Davies
Will America Change? Icon Books, Cambridge, 2008
American Dream, Global Nightmare, Icon Books, Cambridge, 2004
The No Nonsense Guide to Islam, Verso, London, 2004
Why Do People Hate America?, Icon Books, London, 2003
Barbaric Others: A Manifesto on Western Racism, Pluto Press, London, 1993 (also with Ashis Nandy)
Distorted Imagination: Lessons from the Rushdie Affair, Grey Seal/Berita Publishing, London/Kuala Lumpur, 1990
Faces of Islam: Conversations on Contemporary Issues, Barita Books, Kuala Lumpur, 1989

Selected journalism and essays
Ziauddin Sardar, 'What do we mean by Islamic Futures?' in Ibrahim M Abu-Rabi, editor, The Blackwell Companion to Contemporary Islamic Thought, Blackwell, Oxford, 2006, 5562–586.
Ziauddin Sardar, 'The problem of futures studies', in Ziauddin Sardar, editor, Rescuing All Our Futures: The Future of Future Studies, Adamantine Press, London; Praeger Publishers, Westport, CT; 1998, pages 9–18
Ziauddin Sardar, 'Listening to Islam', in Listening to Islam: Praise, Reason and Reflection, ed. John Watson (Brighton: Sussex Academic Press, 2005).
 Ziauddin Sardar, New Statesman 11 December 2006, "Welcome to Planet Blitcon"
 Ziauddin Sardar, New Statesman, 18 July 2005, "The struggle for Islam's soul"
 Ziauddin Sardar, New Statesman, 14 June 2004, 'Is Muslim civilisation set on a fixed course to decline?' Wahhabism, the Saudis' brand of Islam, negates the very idea of evolution in human thought and morality
 Ziauddin Sardar, New Statesman, 9 August 2004, Lost in translation: most English-language editions of the Qur'an have contained numerous errors, omissions and distortions. Hardly surprising, writes Ziauddin Sardar, when one of their purposes was to denigrate not just the Holy Book, but the entire Islamic faith
 Ziauddin Sardar, June 2002, "Rethinking Islam" 
 Ziauddin Sardar, "Medicine and Multiculturalism", New Renaissance, Vol. 11, No. 2, issue 37, Summer 2002
 Audio of Ziauddin Sardar's lecture "Islam and Modernity: The Problem with Paradise" delivered at the Walter Chapin Simpson Center for the Humanities on 5 May 2005.
 Ziauddin Sardar, The Royal Society,"Islam and science: lecture transcript"
 'Same again ...' The Ideas Book edited by Linda Carroli, University of Queensland Press, Brisbane, 2005.
 'Foreword', Black Skin, White Masks by Frantz Fanon, Pluto Press, London
 The Erasure of Islam' tpm: The Philosopher's Magazine Issue 42 Third Quarter 2008 77–79
 ‘Touched by Wonder: Art and Religion in the 21st Century’ in Touched edited by Paul Domela, Liverpool Biennial, Liverpool, and Editore Silvana, Milan, 2011.
 ‘Transmodern Journeys: Futures Studies and Higher Education’ in Adrian Curaj et al., editors, European Higher Education at the Crossroads, Volume 2: Governance, Financing, Mission Diversification and Futures of Higher Education, Heidelberg: Springer, pp1038–1055
 ‘The Future of the Arab Spring in Postnormal Times’ American Journal of Islamic Social Sciences 30 (4) 125-136 Fall
 ‘Islam: Introduction’ in Emma Mason, editor, Reading the Abrahamic Faiths: Rethinking Religion and Literature, Bloomsbury Academic, London, 2015, pp171–181

References

Further reading
"My Philosophy", The Philosophical Magazine 48 120–126 2010
Tony Stevenson, "Ziauddin Sardar: Explaining Islam to the West" in Profiles in Courage: Political Actors and Ideas in Contemporary Asia, editors, Gloria Davies, JV D’Cruz and Nathan Hollier, Australian Scholarly Publishing, Melbourne, 2008.
Anne Marie Dalton, "The Contribution of Ziauddin Sardar’s Work to the Religion-Science Conversation", World Futures: Journal of General Evolution, Volume 63, Issue 8, 2007, Pages 599 – 610.
John Watson, editor, Listening to Islam with Thomas Merton, Sayyid Qutb, Kenneth Cragg and Ziauddin Sardar: Praise, Reason and Reflection,  (Brighton: Sussex Academic Press, 2005).
Jose Maria Ramos, "Memories and method: conversations with Ashis Nandy, Ziauddin Sardar and Richard Slaughter", Futures 37 (5) 433–444 (June 2005).
Leif Stenberg, "Seyyed Hossein Nasr and Ziauddin Sardar on Islam and science: marginalisation or modernisation of a religious tradition", Social Epistemology 10 (3–4)  273–287 July–December 1996.
Tomas Gerholm, "Two Muslim intellectuals in the postmodern world: Akbar Ahmed and Ziauddin Sardar", in Akbar Ahmed and Hastings Donnan (Editors), Islam, Globalization and Postmodernity, Routledge, London, 1994.
Ernest Hahn, "Ziauddin Sardar", Islam and Christian-Muslim Relations 4 (1) 139–143 (June 1993).
Nasim Butt, "Al-Faruqi and Ziauddin Sardar: Islamization of Knowledge or the Social Construction of New Disciplines", Journal of Islamic Science 5 (2) 79–98 (1989)
Halal Monk, Critical Muslims, transmodern tradition, A conversation with Ziauddin Sardar
Susannah Tarbush, "Interview with Muslim Scholar Ziauddin Sardar: Muslims Yearn for Real Debate", Qantara.de, 14.01.2013
Farah Zia, ‘"Much of what we believe in is manufactured dogma"' , The News on Sunday, Lahore, 8 March 2015
"Ziauddin Sardar: The Beginning of Knowledge" in Joan Bakewell, editor, Belief, BBC, London, 2005, 155-168

External links 
 

1951 births
Living people
20th-century British writers
21st-century British writers
Academics of City, University of London
British academics of Pakistani descent
British male journalists
British writers of Pakistani descent
English Muslims
Pakistani emigrants to the United Kingdom
Islam and politics
Muslim reformers
Pakistani academics
Pakistani orientalists
Punjabi academics
Writers from London
20th-century English male writers
Naturalised citizens of the United Kingdom